The Buffalo Presbyterian Church and Cemetery in Greensboro, Guilford County, North Carolina, is a historic Presbyterian church complex and cemetery located at 800 and 803 Sixteenth Street in Greensboro. The Federal-style church sanctuary was built in 1827, and updated and expanded in 1919–1920 in the Colonial Revival style by architect Harry Barton (1876-1937). It was expanded again in 1956. Flanking the sanctuary are two-story Colonial Revival-style educational buildings linked to it by one-story arcades. The rectangular two-story Colonial Revival-style manse and garage were added to the complex in 1924.  The church cemetery has burials dating back to 1775.

It was listed on the National Register of Historic Places in 2002.

References

Churches in Greensboro, North Carolina
Presbyterian churches in North Carolina
Cemeteries in North Carolina
Protestant Reformed cemeteries
Churches on the National Register of Historic Places in North Carolina
Federal architecture in North Carolina
Colonial Revival architecture in North Carolina
National Register of Historic Places in Guilford County, North Carolina